Telecrates laetiorella is a moth of the family Xyloryctidae. It is known from the Australian Capital Territory, New South Wales, Queensland, South Australia and Victoria.

Description
The wingspan is 16–23 mm. Head black, face pale yellow. Palpi whitish-yellowish, base of second joint and terminal joint except base dark fuscous. Antennae yellow-whitish, towards base dark fuscous. Thorax ochreous-yellow. Abdomen light ochreous yellowish, sprinkled with grey. Legs light ochreous-yellowish, anterior and middle pair suffusedly banded with grey. Forewings elongate-oblong, costa moderately arched, apex obtuse, hindmargin faintly sinuate, oblique; ochreous-yellow; two very broad deep purple fasciae, obscurely margined with dark fuscous; first almost basal, outer edge slightly convex; second hindmarginal, anterior edge rather strongly convex: cilia ochreous-yellow, on costa purple-fuscous, at anal angle with a broad deep purple bar. Hindwings with veins 6 and 7 stalked; rather dark fuscous-grey; cilia pale ochreous-yellowish, above apex with a grey line near base.

Biology
The larvae tunnel in the bark of Eucalyptus species (including Eucalyptus rossii), feeding on the inner bark or on the adventitious bark growth around the holes left by wood-boring beetles.

References

Telecrates
Moths described in 1864